Sam Rayburn Reservoir is a reservoir in the United States in Deep East Texas,  north of Beaumont. The reservoir is fed by the Angelina River, the major tributary of the Neches River. The Reservoir is upstream of the Big Thicket National Preserve.

The reservoir is operated by the United States Army Corps of Engineers, Fort Worth district.

History 

Construction began September 7, 1956, and the reservoir began serving its purpose on March 29, 1965. The main purposes of the reservoir are flood control, hydroelectric power generation, and conservation of water. Construction costs, including those for recreation facilities, were estimated at about $66 million.

It was known as McGee Bend Dam and Reservoir until 1963. In September of that year, the 88th Congress adopted a special resolution changing the name to "Sam Rayburn Dam and Reservoir" in honor of the recently deceased Speaker of the House Sam Rayburn, a long-time champion of soil and water conservation. Dedication ceremonies were held on May 8, 1965.

In accordance with the 1945 federal Rivers and Harbors Act, four reservoirs were originally approved for the Neches and Angelina Rivers Basin. They were designated as Dam A, Dam B, Rockland, and McGee Bend. The first to be built was Dam B, completed on the Neches River in 1953. The name was changed to Town Bluff Dam and B. A. Steinhagen Reservoir, but locals still refer to it as Dam B. In 1955, Congress approved the funding for McGee Bend Dam and Reservoir, and construction began in 1957. Congress changed the name to Sam Rayburn Dam and Reservoir in 1963, and it was formally dedicated in 1965. The Dam A and Rockland dams, which were to be on the Neches River upstream from the convergence of the Neches and Angelina Rivers, were deemed to be unnecessary and listed as "deferred".

Lake Sam Rayburn can be crossed on Texas State Highway 147 and is a popular recreation destination, both for boating and fishing, with game fish species in the lake including largemouth bass, bluegill, and channel catfish. Due to the abundance of bass, it is home to more than 300 tournaments annually, which include tournaments such as the Bassmaster Elite Series and Opens, BASS Champs, BFL, Major League Fishing, Toyota Series, the Cabela's Texas Team Trail, Angler's Quest, Bass-n-Bucks, and McDonald's Big Bass Splash. In 2018, Lake Sam Rayburn was ranked number one by Bassmaster magazine for being the best bass lake in the nation.

Notable people
The science-fiction and fantasy writer Ardath Mayhar lived near Sam Rayburn Lake, on a homestead bordering the Attoyac River above the lake. She wrote her tales there and also at a local bookstore she ran.

References

Further reading

External links
Sam Rayburn Lake Home Page

Corps of Engineers Lake Sam Rayburn Home Page

Protected areas of Angelina County, Texas
Geography of Texas
Protected areas of Jasper County, Texas
Reservoirs in Texas
Protected areas of Sabine County, Texas
Protected areas of San Augustine County, Texas
1956 establishments in Texas
Dams in Texas
United States Army Corps of Engineers dams
Bodies of water of Angelina County, Texas
Bodies of water of Jasper County, Texas
Bodies of water of Sabine County, Texas
Bodies of water of San Augustine County, Texas